Inositol monophosphatase 3 also known as inositol monophosphatase domain-containing protein 1 (IMPAD1) is an enzyme that in humans is encoded by the IMPAD1 gene.

This gene encodes a member of the inositol monophosphatase family. The encoded protein is localized to the Golgi apparatus and catalyzes the hydrolysis of phosphoadenosine phosphate (PAP) to adenosine monophosphate (AMP).

Clinical significance 

Mutations in this gene are a cause of GRAPP type chondrodysplasia with joint dislocations, and a pseudogene of this gene is located on the long arm of chromosome 1.

References  

EC 3.1.3